Khandaker Abu Nasr Muhammad Abdullah Jahangir (1 February 1961 – 11 May 2016), or simply known as Abdullah Jahangir, was a Bangladeshi Islamic scholar, professor, author and television presenter. He also made appearances on various national and international television channels discussing contemporary issues relating to Islam including Peace TV, ATN Bangla, NTV, Channel 9 and Islamic TV, and would also participate in public lectures across Bangladesh. He is the founder of As-Sunnah Trust, a non-profit educational charity organisation. During his time as the Professor of Al-Hadith and Islamic Studies at the Islamic University, Bangladesh, 12 students received PhD and 30 received MPhil. Jahangir authored many books pertaining to Islam in Bengali, English and Arabic. His work on Islamic economics is included in the Bangladesh Madrasah Education Board.

Early life and family 

Jahangir was born on 5 November 1958 in the village of Dignagar in Shailkupa, Jhenaidah subdivision, which was then located in the Jessore District of East Pakistan. He belonged to a Bengali Muslim family of Khandakars hailing from the village of Narharidra. His father's name was Khandaker Anwaruzzaman and his mother's name was Begum Lutfunnahar. During his early years, Jahangir's father relocated with his family to the village of Dhopaghata-Gobindpur.

Jahangir was married to Fatima, daughter of Pir Abdul Kahhar Siddiqui of Furfura Sharif. They have one son (Khandaker Usama Jahangir) and three daughters (Zakia Khandaker, Rifat Khandaker and Busaina Khandaker).

Education 
Jahangir studied at the Bhutiargati Government Primary School in Jhenaidah, and then joined the Jhenaidah Siddiqia Kamil Madrasah where he received his dakhil certificate in 1973 and alim certificate in 1975. He remained at the madrasa, graduating with fazil (honours) in 1977, and then completed kamil (masters) in Hadith studies at the Government Madrasah-e-Alia in Dhaka. He was awarded with Mumtaz Al-Muhadditheen, the highest Hadith award in the country. Among his teachers were Ubaidul Haq, Ayub Ali, Muhammad Abdur Rahim, Fakhruddin Chatgami, Miya Muhammad Qasimi and Anwarul Haq Qasimi. In addition to his Islamic education, Jahangir under took examinations for SSC and HSC at the Government Huseyn Shaheed Suhrawardy College in Magura and topped the Jessore Board. At that time, those who had won the first place in Bangladesh's education boards were taken on a boat trip with erstwhile President Ziaur Rahman as part of the state honours.

Having completing his kamil degree, Jahangir became a teacher at the Nasna Nurnagar Siddiqia Dakhil Madrasa in Jheinadah. Two years later, he decided to pursue his goal of seeking further Islamic knowledge and enrolled at the Imam Muhammad ibn Saud Islamic University in Riyadh, Saudi Arabia. He completed his BA in 1986, MA in 1992 and PhD in 1997. Among his teachers in Saudi Arabia were Abd al-Aziz ibn Baz, Muhammad ibn al-Uthaymeen, Abdullah Ibn Jibreen and Saleh Al-Fawzan. Jahangir received two consecutive Student awards from the King Fahd of Saudi Arabia and the Governor of Riyadh, Salman bin Abdulaziz. During his studies in Saudi Arabia, Jahangir served as a translator and da'i for the North Riyadh Islamic Centre between 1993 and 1997. According to Abdus Salam Azadi, more than 300 foreign students (mainly Americans) converted to Islam as a result of the dawah of Abdullah Jahangir and Zaghloul El-Naggar. In 1999, Jahangir visited Indonesia where he received advanced training in Islamic development and Arabic language.

Career 
After finishing Kamil at Dhaka Alia Madrasa, he taught Nasna Nurnagar Siddiquia Dakhil Madrasah, Jhenaidah for about two years. In his university life, he worked as a clerk and translator at the Northern Riyadh Islamic Center from 1993 to 1996. 

Jahangir returned from Saudi Arabia in 1998, and became a lecturer at the Islamic University, Bangladesh's Department of Al-Hadith and Islamic Studies. In 2009, he was promoted to the post of Professor for the department. He was also briefly the Shaykh al-Hadith (Professor of Hadith) of Darussalam Madrasa in Dhaka, where he taught Sahih al-Bukhari. Abubakar Muhammad Zakaria was his junior colleague in Islamic University, Bangladesh and they worked togather in the university.

Jahangir served as the Imam of Jhenaidah Jame Mosque and Central Eidgah until his death. He would regularly participate in public conferences. Jahangir also used to visit remote areas of Bangladesh to preach Islam. Many people and native Islamic scholars have praised him. In 2007, he was awarded the Best Literary Award by the Quran Education Society after the publication of Iḥyā as-Sunan.

As-Sunnah Trust and Al-Faruq Academy 
He established two institutions in the Gobindpur locality of Jhenaidah town. In 20 January 2011, Jahangir founded "As-Sunnah Trust" which is a non-profit charity organisation focusing on social and religious services. The Trust has a school, Madrasah as-Sunnah, which serves 400 students, both boys and girls. The Trust also caters towards elders, and distributes books, healthcare and food to poor people. Other bodies within the Trust include As-Sunnah Publications, As-Sunnah Trust Library, As-Sunnah Trust Mosque (four-storey mosque) and Markaz as-Sunnah Maktab. The second institution that Jahangir founded was Al-Faruq Academy which provides a two-year advanced hadith studies programme for both Alia and Qaumi students. Other than that, Jahangir also established the Nurani Maktab. Jahangir was also the founder and secretary of Jhenaidah Charity Foundation, and a founding member of the International Islamic Institute.

Works 
Jahangir has written over 30 books and 50 articles in Bengali, English and Arabic, found in both national and international journals. A methodological analysis of his jurisprudential literature was conducted at the Asian University of Bangladesh. His most famous works are Hadīser Name Jaliẏati and Rāhē Belaẏat which are very popular in Bangladesh, India and Pakistan. Among his written works are: 

 English
 A Woman From Desert (1995)
 Guidance For Fasting Muslims (1997)
 A Summary Of Three Fundamentals of Islam. (1997)
 Bengali
 Iḥyā as-Sunan -- January 2007 (Bengali: এহইয়াউস সুনান)
 Qur'ān Sunnaher Aloke Poshak -- January 2007 (Bengali: কুরআন-সুন্নাহর আলোকে পোশাক)
 Khutbah al-Islām, January 2008 -- (Bengali:খুতবাতুল ইসলাম)
 Islāmer Name Jaṅgibād, January 2009 -- (Bengali:ইসলামের নামে জঙ্গিবাদ)
 Qurbānī O Zabīḥullāh -- January 2010 (Bengali: কুরবানী ও জবিহুল্লাহ) ISBN Number: 9789849328293
 Rāhē Belaẏat -- January 2013 (Bengali:রাহে বেলায়াত) ISBN Number: 9789849005315
 Hadīther Sanad-Bichār Paddhati O Ṣaḥīḥ Hadīther Aloke Ṣalāt al-ʿĪder Atirikta Takbīr -- January 2013 (Bengali: হাদীসের সনদ-বিচার পদ্ধতি ও সহীহ হাদীসের আলোকে সালাতুল ঈদের অতিরিক্ত তাকবীর) ISBN Number: 9789849005346
 Pôbitrô Bible: Pôricitô O Pôrjalocôna -- January 2016 (Bengali:পবিত্র বাইবেলঃ পরিচিত ও পর্যালোচনা) ISBN Number: 9789849005377
 Hadīther Name Jaliẏati -- January 2017 (Bengali: হাদিসের নামে জালিয়াতি) ISBN Number: 9789849005315
 Qur'ān Sunnaher Aloke Islāmī ʿAqīdāh -- January 2017 (Bengali: কুরআন সুন্নাহের আলোকে ইসলামী আকিদা) ISBN Number: 9789849328100
 Ṣalāter Maddhe Hāt Bāndhār Bidhān -- January 2017 (Bengali: সালাতের মধ্যে হাত বাধার বিধান) ISBN Number: 9789849005360
 Ṣaḥīḥ Masnūn Waẓīfah  -- January 2017 (Bengali: সহি মাসনুন অজিফা) ISBN Number: 9789849005322
 Furfurar Pīr ʿAllāmah Abū Jaʿfar Ṣiddīqī Rôchitô Al-Mawzuʿāt -- January 2017 (Bengali: ফুরফুরার পীর আল্লামা আবু জাফর সিদ্দিকী আল মাওজুয়াত) ISBN Number:9789849328186
 Jiggasha O Jobab (4 Part) -- January 2018 (Bengali: জিজ্ঞাসা ও জবাব) ISBN Number: 9789849328216(1st part), 9789849328223 (2nd Part), 9789849363323 (3rd part) and 9789849363378 (4 part)
 Ṣalāt, Duʿāʾ O Zikir -- January 2018 (Bengali: সালাত, দোয়া ও জিকির) ISBN Number: 9789849363316
 Ramadānēr Saogat -- January 2018 (Bengali: রামাদানের সওগাত) ISBN Number: 9789849363309
 ʿĪd-e-Mīlād an-Nabī -- January 2018 (Bengali: ঈদে মিলাদুন্নবী) ISBN Number: 9789849328292
 Kitāb al-Muqaddas, Injīl Sharīf O ʿĪsāẏī Dharma -- January 2018 (Bengali: কিতাবুল মোকাদ্দস, ইঞ্জিল শরীফ ও ঈসায়ী ধর্ম) ISBN Number: 9789849005308
 Roza (Bengali: রোজা)
 Islāmer Tin Mūlnīti (Bengali: ইসলামের তিন মূলনীতি)
 Ḥajjer Adhyāttik Shikkhā (Bengali: হজ্জ্বের আধ্যাত্মিক শিক্ষা) 
 Rasūlullāh (Sa)-er Poshak o Poshaker Islāmī Bidhanmala 2008 (Bengali: রাসুলুল্লাহ (সা)-এর পোশাক ও পোশাকের ইসলামি বিধানমালা) 
 Munājāt O Namāz (Bengali: মুনাজাত ও নামায)
 Allāhr Pothe Daʿwat (Bengali: আল্লাহর পথে দাওয়াত)
 Bangladeshe Ushôr Ba Fôsôler Zakat: Guruttô O Prôyog (Bengali: বাংলাদেশে উশর বা ফসলের যাকাত: গুরুত্ব ও প্রয়োগ)
 Qur'ān Sunnahr Aloke Jamāʿat O Oikko, 2017 (Bengali: কুরআন সুন্নাহর আলোকে জামায়াত ও ঐক্য)
 Musalmanī Neṣāb: Arakāne Islām O Waẓīfa-e-Rasūl, 2018 (Bengali: মুসলমানী নেসাব: আরাকানে ইসলাম ও ওযীফায়ে রাসূল (সা.)) 
 Arabic
 Adab al-Ḥadīth, 2007 (Arabic: أدب الحديث)
 Buḥūth fī al-ʿUlūm al-Ḥadīth, January 2007 (Arabic: بحوث في العلوم الحديث)
 Translatation:
 ʿAlā Fiqh al-Akbar January 2014 (Bengali: আল ফিকহুল আকবর) ISBN Number: 9789849005353
 Fiqh as-Sunan al-Āthār (3 Part) -- January 2019 (Bengali: ফিকহুস সুনান আল আসার) ISBN Number: 9789849363330(1st part), 9789849363354(2nd part), 9789849363361(3rd part)
 Ekjôn Japanī Narīr Drishtite Ḥijāb (Bengali: একজন জাপানি নারীর দৃষ্টিতে হিজাব)
 Iẓhār al-Ḥaqq (3 part) -- January 2020 (Bengali: ইযহারুল হক) ISBN Number: 9789849328247(1st),9789849363392(2nd) and 9789849363308(3rd)

Death and legacy 
Abdullah Jahangir died in a road accident on the spot on 11 May 2016, on the Dhaka-Khulna highway in Magura in the collision of his microbus and covered-van. Many people condoled his death.

In 2017, a memoir book was written and dedicated to Khandaker Abdullah Jahangir titled Preronar Batighor (Beacon of Inspiration) edited by Abul Kalam Azad Azhari of the Bangladesh National Mufassir Council. The book contains his biography, and memoirs written by Emajuddin Ahamed (former Vice-Chancellor of Dhaka University), poet Al Mahmud, advocate Muhammad Abdur Rouf and economist Shah Abdul Hannan. A conference in memory of him was held at the As-Safa Islamic Centre in New York City. In 2017, the Islamic University, Bangladesh held a seminar dedicated to his life. In 2020, As-Sunnah Publications released an official biography titled Juger Mohan Dai Dr. Khandaker Abdullah Jahangir (Rahimahullah) and it contains memoirs written by several Islamic scholars of Bangladesh.

Bibliography
 (Biography of Khandaker Abdullah Jahangir)

References 

Bangladeshi academics
Bangladeshi writers
Academic staff of the Islamic University, Bangladesh
Government Madrasah-e-Alia alumni
Imam Muhammad ibn Saud Islamic University alumni
Bangladeshi Muslims
Bangladeshi educators
Bangladeshi translators
Bangladeshi textbook writers
Bangladeshi television personalities
Bangladeshi Sunni Muslim scholars of Islam
Bengali Muslim scholars of Islam